McNamee is a Canadian community in the rural community of Upper Miramichi in Northumberland County, New Brunswick.

Home of the McNamee-Priceville Footbridge, and many great fishing pools.

History

The first settlers in McNamee included John Wilson (b. Scotland, date unknown) who applied for a grant of land on the Southwest Branch of the Miramichi River on February 19, 1803, and settled on Lot #69 in 1804. He located his homestead on the interval (island) in the river but relocated to higher ground the following year (1805) near the current Priceville footbridge after the spring freshet surrounded the home with water and ice.  After improving 40 of the 300 acres he had been granted John Wilson petitioned the Governor for more land on the north side of the river in response to a dispute with his neighbour James Lyons which ultimately deprived him of 120 of his original 300 acre grant.  His petition was approved and he was granted Lot #69 on the north side of the river in what is now Priceville.

In addition to farming, lumbering and fishing were the primary pursuits in the area and the Wilson family in particular played a central role in the region since it was first settled.  The wealth and stature of the family grew especially from the 1920s through the 1940s under the leadership of Willard Wilson who became the de facto mayor by way of developing the Wilson Homestead into the local lumber mill, post office, grocery store, cattle and dairy farm, and fly fishing lodge.  Upon Willard's death in 1949 his son Murray focused the family business in particular on developing the homestead into a fly fishing lodge in response to the growing interest in Atlantic salmon from anglers based in particular in the northeast United States.

Notable people

John Wilson (b. Scotland, date unknown) died in McNamee between 1834 (the date of his will) and 1851.  His date of arrival in Canada is unknown but was likely through the port of St. John and he settled temporarily in Maugerville, New Brunswick where his first son, James, was born in 1802.  John applied for a grant of land on the Southwest Branch of the Miramichi River on February 19, 1803, in the area now known as McNamee and gained title in Grant #487 dated June 20, 1809, to "Ephraim Betts, Esq., and sixty others... 14,640 acres on the Southwest Branch of the Miramichi River in the County of Northumberland.  Initially settling on the north side of the river on Lot #69 in 1804 he later acquired Lot#64 (which is now owned by James K Wilson B. March 31, 1963, in North Bay, Ontario).

James Wilson (b. 1802 in Maugerville New Brunswick. Died Oct 1861) was the first Wilson of the Upper Miramichi to be born in Canada.
Agnes Ann Wilson, b. 1804 or 1805. Married James Redman July 3, 1827, b. 1800 in Cape Rosier Maine and died January 16, 1854, and the couple are buried in Woodlawn Cemetery, Biddeford Maine.

Thomas Wilson, b. 1815 married his stepsister Barbara MacNabb February 8, 1841.  Their issue:
Catherine Isabel Wilson, b. April 12, 1841
John Turnbull Wilson, b. November 9, 1843, d.December 23, 1886
Elizabeth Ann Wilson, b. 1846
Thomas Wilson-2, b. 1849 d. January 1894
Peter Nathaniel Wilson, b. 1852
Amelia Ann MacKay Wilson, b. 1857

John Turnbull Wilson married Lydia L. Avery in Fredericton on October 24, 1877. Lydia was born April 18, 1849, and died October 3, 1931, and she and John are buried in the United Church Cemetery in Boisetown. The couple built a home just north of the original Wilson homestead in McNamee.  Their issue:
Willard Weston Wilson, b. January 3, 1879 - 1949.  
Grace Saunders Wilson, b. November 19, 1880.
Charles Thomas Wilson, b. March 30, 1885, d. September 21, 1890.

Willard Wilson was a farmer, woodsman, self-taught veterinarian, grocer, postmaster and entrepreneur. He married Sarah Carroll (1886-1955) of Carrolls Crossing, N.B. on July 15, 1903, and their issue included 9 children:
Marie Grace Wilson (b. March 14, 1904, d. July 27, 1971), Frances Gertrude Wilson (b. September 1, 1905, d. September 27, 1985), Thomas Wilson (b. April 18, 1907, d. April 25, 1991), Louise Elizabeth Wilson (b. March 30, 1909, d. January 23, 1988), Murray Wilson (b. August 9, 1910, d. December 19, 1974), Willard Woodrow Wilson (b. April 30, 1918, d. July 3, 2010), Laurence Russel Wilson (b. March 12, 1920, d. March 25, 2000) and James Reginald Wilson (b. May 16, 1922, d. April 14, 2001). There was also a child born in 1911-12 who died in infancy.

Laurence married Esma Rebecca Grady of Blackville (b. May 10, 1923, d. August 14, 2008).  Their issue was Laurence Kendall Wilson (b. June 16, 1942), Ferol Elizabeth Wilson (b. December 3, 1943, d. September 21, 2010), Karin Rebecca Wilson (b. July 3, 1951), Larry Russell Wilson (b. January 26, 1960) and James Kevin Wilson (b. March 31, 1963).

Laurence and Esma moved from McNamee to Fredericton where he taught at the Devon Normal School.  They subsequently moved to Temiskaming, Quebec in 1957 for another teaching position.  Esma's older sister Roberta (who had married Merle Gilks) was stationed with her husband at CFB North Bay and convinced Laurence and Esma to move to that city in 1959.  They lived briefly at Sunset Point on Lake Nipissing before moving to 643 Champlain Street in Thibeault Terrace where in his spare time Laurence wrote his Master's Thesis and became a Master Gardener and president of the North Bay Horticultural Society.  Their property became well known for the quality and quantity of its flower gardens and Laurence was recognized for his volunteer work by the City of North Bay as one of its top 100 citizens during the city's centennial in 1976.

See also
List of communities in New Brunswick

References

Settlements in New Brunswick
Communities in Northumberland County, New Brunswick